Adam Terry (born September 1, 1982) is a former American football offensive tackle. He was drafted by the Baltimore Ravens in the second round of the 2005 NFL Draft. He played college football at Syracuse.

He has also been a member of the Indianapolis Colts, San Diego Chargers, Jacksonville Jaguars and Tennessee Titans.

Early years
Terry attended Queensbury High School in Queensbury, New York. As a junior, he was a first-team All-Conference pick and a first-team All-State selection, and was named an All-East selection by Prep Football Report.

College career
Terry played college football at Syracuse where he started in the final 35 games of his career there. He earned a degree in History.

Professional career

Baltimore Ravens

Terry was selected by the Baltimore Ravens in the second round (64th overall) in the 2005 NFL Draft. In his rookie season, he played in seven games. In the 2006 season he played in all 16 regular season games and was part of an offensive line that only allowed 17 sacks, a franchise record. Furthermore, that season the Ravens rushed for 1,637 yards and 11 touchdowns. However, Terry continued to struggle with injuries, which led to his departure.

Indianapolis Colts
Terry signed with the Indianapolis Colts on March 12, 2010.
Terry was cut by Colts following Training Camp.

San Diego Chargers
Signed on September 5, 2010 following his release from the Colts, Terry spent two games in San Diego before being released to make room for receiver Kelley Washington on November 4.

Tennessee Titans
On August 15, 2011, he signed with the Tennessee Titans, but he was released by the team on September 3, 2011.

References

2. Queensbury's Terry a Raven." Albany Times Union [Albany, NY] April 24, 2005: C1. Infotrac Newsstand. Web. February 4, 2014.

External links
Ravens Player Bio
San Diego Chargers Bio

1982 births
Living people
People from Queensbury, New York
Players of American football from New York (state)
American football offensive tackles
Syracuse Orange football players
Baltimore Ravens players
Indianapolis Colts players
San Diego Chargers players
Jacksonville Jaguars players
Tennessee Titans players